Les Investissements Nolinor Inc., trading as Nolinor Aviation, is a charter airline based in Mirabel, a suburb of Montreal, Quebec, Canada. It operates passenger charter and cargo services within Canada and to the U.S. Its main base is Montréal–Mirabel International Airport. It has 200 employees.

History 
The airline was established in 1992 and started operations in 1997. Since June 1999 it has also been authorized to provide its own aircraft maintenance.

In 2001, the company bought its first fully cargo Convair 580 and started providing cargo service to the United States and the northern region of Canada. In order to respond to the growing cargo market, Nolinor Aviation bought two more full cargo Convair 580s in 2004. In 2006, the fourth passenger Convair 580 was purchased.

In 2004, the Prud'Homme family trust became the majority stockholder. Expanding very rapidly, Nolinor needed more space for its Convair 580 fleet and in 2005 the company moved its maintenance facilities to Mirabel International Airport.

In 2006, the company was named one of the best enterprises in the province of Quebec by the National Bank of Canada. Nolinor is taking its share of the market outside the Quebec region.

In 2007, Nolinor Aviation acquired two ex-Royal Air Maroc Boeing 737-200 combis (freight/passenger). 

In 2011, Nolinor acquired another 737-200 full freighter, for its cargo operations.

In 2013, Nolinor began charter service from the Region of Waterloo International Airport to Mary River Aerodrome via Iqaluit Airport using a Boeing 737-200 with three times weekly service and a fourth flight every other week. This service has since ended.

In 2014, Nolinor added a Learjet 31 corporate jet to its fleet.

In 2016, Nolinor Aviation added a 737-300 to its fleet.

In September 2017, Nolinor participated in the rescue of stranded passengers from Air France Flight 66 which made an emergency landing at Goose Bay Airport in Goose Bay, Newfoundland and Labrador, Canada, after experiencing an engine loss over the Atlantic Ocean. Passengers were ferried to their original destination at Los Angeles International Airport, with a stop at Winnipeg James Armstrong Richardson International Airport.

In 2020, the Montreal Alouettes and Nolinor Aviation planned to team up for the next ten years, as Nolinor remained the club's official charter flight partner. This new deal went even further than the previous one, as a Boeing 737 plane was personalized with the team's logo and colours.

Nolinor also launched OWG, a new airline, to offer a unique travel experience to tropical destinations.

Operations 

Nolinor's primary bases of operations include:
Montréal–Mirabel International Airport
Montréal–Dorval International Airport
Winnipeg James Armstrong Richardson International Airport
Region of Waterloo International Airport
Val-d'Or Airport

Livery 

In 2003, the Netherlands-based airline branding firm Lila Design re-designed Nolinor's logo and aircraft paint design into a stylized white, blue and gold image.

Fleet 
The Nolinor Aviation fleet includes the following aircraft (as of September 28, 2021)

References

External links 

Nolinor Aviation

Airlines established in 1992
Charter airlines of Canada
Companies based in Montreal
Regional airlines of Quebec